Joan d'Acosta (– ) was a Jewish jester at the court of Czar Peter the Great of Russia in the first half of the eighteenth century. 

Born in Holland or Morocco into a Portuguese Marrano family, d'Acosta worked as a broker in Hamburg before settling in Saint Petersburg. He received an appointment as jester in 1714. 

D'Acosta is described as having been very clever and witty, well-versed in Scripture, and a master of numerous European languages. Czar Peter reportedly enjoyed discussing philosophical and theological questions with him, which often led to heated arguments. As a reward for his services, the Czar gave him the uninhabited island of Sammer in the Gulf of Finland, along with the mock title "King of the Samoyeds." He retained his position as court jester under Empress Anne.

Legacy
D'Acosta appears as a protagonist in David Markish's 1983 novel Jesters.

References
 

1660s births
1740 deaths
Year of birth uncertain
Year of death uncertain
17th-century Sephardi Jews
18th-century Sephardi Jews
17th-century Russian people
18th-century people from the Russian Empire
People of Portuguese-Jewish descent
Da Costa family
Dutch emigrants to the Russian Empire
Jews from the Russian Empire
Jesters
Peter the Great
Russian Sephardi Jews